Marion Loretta Reid,  (born January 4, 1929) is a former Canadian politician, the first female Speaker of the Legislative Assembly of Prince Edward Island, and the 24th as well as first female, Lieutenant Governor of Prince Edward Island.

Born in North Rustico, Prince Edward Island, the daughter of Michael Doyle and Loretta Whelan, she was first elected in 1979 to the Legislative Assembly of Prince Edward Island as the Prince Edward Island Progressive Conservative Party candidate in the district of 1st Queens. She was re-elected in 1982 and 1986. She was Deputy Speaker, Speaker and Opposition House Leader. She was Lieutenant Governor of Prince Edward Island from 1990 to 1995.

In 1994, the PEI Council of the Girl Guides of Canada created an award in her name in recognition of her contributions. In 1996, she was awarded the Order of Prince Edward Island and was made a Member of the Order of Canada.

Arms

References

 

1929 births
Living people
People from Queens County, Prince Edward Island
Lieutenant Governors of Prince Edward Island
Members of the Order of Canada
Members of the Order of Prince Edward Island
Progressive Conservative Party of Prince Edward Island MLAs
Women MLAs in Prince Edward Island
Speakers of the Legislative Assembly of Prince Edward Island
Canadian women viceroys
Women legislative speakers